Nikolai Ivanovich Shakura (Николай Иванович Шакура; born October 7, 1945 in Belarus SSR) is a Russian astrophysicist. He is the head of the relativistic astrophysics department at the Sternberg Astronomical Institute, Moscow University. As a well-known specialist in the theory of accretion disks, as well as X-ray binaries, together with Rashid Sunyaev, he is particularly famous as the developer of the standard theory of disk accretion.

1945 births
Living people
Russian astronomers
Russian physicists
Academic staff of Moscow State University